Skyview Elementary School may refer to:

 Skyview Elementary School, Macon, Georgia; Bibb County School District
 Skyview Elementary School, Spokane, Washington; East Valley School District  (now closed)

See also
 Skyview School (disambiguation)